Clint Morris is an Australian entertainment writer, publicist and producer. He is the CEO of publicity and publishing firm October Coast, a partner in October Coast Entertainment and a partner in the production company Shorris Film, with producing credits including Radio America and Complacent.

Early life
Clint Morris is the elder of two children of Robert and Heather Morris. Morris spent his teenage years working at drive-in theaters, video stores and at radio stations, where he would begin his career as a broadcast journalist. Morris attended North Shepparton Secondary College in Shepparton. He was a finalist valedictorian at college, graduating with a bachelor of business.  He also holds advanced diplomas in Advertising and Marketing, and a certificate in Commercial Radio announcing.

Journalist career
Morris began his career as a radio announcer at several Victorian radio stations in the mid-1990s. Morris said of his entrance into journalism:I believe I was about 16 or 17 when I started reviewing for local radio, which led to a regular gig as a radio announcer for a few years, if only because I was the only film fanatic in country Victoria that knew his Cimino's from his Friedkin's. No matter which station I ended up at, I’d always end up saddling the film reviewing job. I didn't complain. I even got to see Sliver a few days before release. But the experience on radio led to some reviewing work with a couple of newspapers and magazines and a TV show. By the time I was 21 I was working in marketing and publicity, but I never let the film reviewing go completely.

Filmmaking career
After working on a contract basis on several studio pictures as a producer and screenwriter, Morris decided to officially enter the film-making world, joining actor and filmmaker Christopher Showerman to form Shorris Film, a Los Angeles-based independent film production company. The duo's first film was Between the Sand and the Sky. Morris went on to produce such films as Complacent and Radio America. He co-produced Vitals in 2014.

October Coast
Morris had freelanced and moonlighted as an agent and publicist for several years before opening October Coast, a full-service public relations and publishing firm in March 2012.

Producer credits
 Vitals (2014)
 Condition Dead (2014) (in development)
 Room & Board (2013) (associate producer)
 Bristled (2013)
 Knockout (2013)
 Radio America (2012)
 Top Priority : The Terror Within (2012) – also publicist
 Complacent' (2010)
 Rampage (2010)
 A Lonely Place for Dying (2008)
 Dead Country (2008)
 Between the Sand and the Sky (2008)
 Raiders of the Damned (2007; video)
 Traveller : Red (2006; video) – also voice
 Shortcut to Happiness (2004)
 The Lion King 2: Simba's Pride'' (1998) – assistant

References

External links
 

1975 births
Date of birth missing (living people)
Australian expatriates in the United States
Australian film producers
Living people